The Holy See Press Office publishes the official news of the activities of the Pope and of the various departments of the Roman Curia. All speeches, messages, documents, as well as the statements issued by the Director, are published in their entirety.

Role

The press office operates every day in Italian, although texts in other languages are also available.

On Saturday 27 June 2015 Pope Francis, through an apostolic letter or motu proprio ("on his own initiative") established the Secretariat for Communications in the Roman Curia; the Press Office was incorporated into it, but at the same time belongs to the Secretary of State. On 21 December 2015 Pope Francis appointed Dr. Greg Burke, formerly the Communications Advisor for the Section for General Affairs of the Vatican's Secretariat of State of the Holy See (a key department in the Roman Curia), as Deputy Director of the Press Office.

Following Burke's appointment as director in 2016, Spanish journalist Paloma García Ovejero took over as vice director, making her the first woman to hold that position. It was also announced that both Burke and García Ovejero, both laymen, would later begin their positions on 1 August 2016. On 31 December 2018, both Burke and García Ovejero announced their resignations.

In July 2019, Pope Francis named British-born Italian layman Matteo Bruni as Director. Bruni is the first non-journalist to serve in this position. The same month, the Pope appointed Brazilian laywoman Cristiane Murray, who previously served as the Vatican Radio's commentator for papal events and international trips for 25 years, as Vice Director.

Directors

Vice Directors 
 Ciro Benedettini (unknown, 2012, unknown)
 Paloma García Ovejero (2016–2018)
 Cristiane Murray (2019–present)

See also
 Vatican – Accreditation of journalists and Media operators
 Vatican – Daily Bulletin
 Holy See
 Index of Vatican City-related articles

References

External links
Official site

 

Holy See
Multilingual news services
Dicastery for Communication
News agencies based in Vatican City